Hector Creek is a  long 3rd order tributary to the Cape Fear River in Harnett County, North Carolina.

Course
Hector Creek rises in a pond about 0.5 miles northeast of Duncan, North Carolina in Wake County and then flows south to Harnett County to join the Cape Fear River about 4 miles southwest of Kipling, North Carolina.

Watershed
Hector Creek drains  of area, receives about 46.6 in/year of precipitation, has a wetness index of 410.00 and is about 50% forested.

See also
List of rivers of North Carolina

References

Rivers of North Carolina
Rivers of Harnett County, North Carolina
Rivers of Wake County, North Carolina
Tributaries of the Cape Fear River